The Makira thrush (Zoothera margaretae), also known as the San Cristobal thrush, is a species of bird in the family Turdidae. It is endemic to the Solomon Islands.  Its natural habitat is subtropical or tropical moist lowland forests. It is threatened by habitat loss.

References

Makira thrush
Birds of Makira
Makira thrush
Taxonomy articles created by Polbot